The following is a list of Marvel Comics Golden Age characters and teams that first appeared in Marvel Comics during the Golden Age of Comic Books (late 1930s and c. 1950), under both of Marvel's previous names, Timely Comics and Atlas Comics.

Characters

1930s

1940s

1950s

1960s (pre-Fantastic Four #1)

Modern Age Golden Age

These characters all appeared after Marvel Comics was established, but were retconned as characters who were active during the Golden Age.

Teams

See also
Marvel: The Lost Generation
V-Battalion
Warriors Three

References

Golden Age characters, List of Marvel Comics